Duchow is a surname. Notable people with the surname include:

Cindi Duchow (born 1959), American retail manager, buyer, and politician
Lawrence Duchow (1914–1972), American bandleader
Marvin Duchow (1914–1979), Canadian composer, teacher, and musicologist

See also
Duchów